"Calabria" is a song by Danish DJ/producer Rune Reilly Kölsch. It was originally released in 2003 by Credence, a sublabel of Parlophone Records.

The song has been remixed or released in numerous other versions by different artists, the most successful being "Calabria 2007" by Enur with vocals by Natasja Saad. Others include records by Drunkenmunky, Dirty Laundry and Kaner in 2004, by Alex Gaudino featuring vocals from Crystal Waters on "Destination Calabria" in 2006, by Criminal Vibes in 2013 and by Firebeatz and Jaques Le Noir in 2014. In 2007, Pitbull and Lil Jon sampled "Calabria 2007" in "The Anthem".

In 2014, British musician Guppy Slim played a set dedicated to "Calabria" at Casa Del Vibe in Bristol. It was recorded and played on BBC Radio 6 Music at various times following its performance. 

In June 2022, two songs that sample "Calabria" were found climbing the UK top 30 at the same time. The higher charting track of the two, as of 17 June 2022, was "21 Reasons" by DJ Nathan Dawe and singer Ella Henderson at number 9, while eight places below was West London drill rapper Benzz with "Je M'appelle". Both songs sample the riff from "Calabria", while "Je M'appelle" also samples vocals from "Calabria 2007".

Calabria is the name of a region in southern Italy.

Track listing 
2003 12" vinyl
"Calabria" (Original Mix) - 7:45
"Calabria" (Artificial Funk Remix) - 9:14
"Calabria" (DJ Tool) - 2:05

Charts

Drunkenmunky version

Dutch group Drunkenmunky produced and released their version of "Calabria" in 2004. A remix in 2007 titled "Calabria (2007 Jump Mix)" was released which also charted.

Charts

Dirty Laundry version

"Calabria 2007" (Enur remix)

In 2007, a remix with additional dancehall beats and vocals by Danish reggae singer Natasja Saad was released, titled "Calabria 2007", by Rune and Johannes Torpe under the name Enur. This reggae fusion version has been very successful around the world and gained popularity in the United States in mid-to-late 2007. It received heavy club play, eventually entering the playlist of major Top-40/Dance radio stations such as Z100 and KTU. It placed at #80 on Z100's top 100 songs of 2007.  This version was featured in a Target advertisement for the 2007–2008 school year, featuring college dorm supplies, and due to the song's prominence in the ad, the song received much exposure.

In 2008, the song hit the U.S. Billboard Hot 100 at number 46, making it one of the highest peaking reggae fusion songs in 2008. There is also another remix featuring Mims and a Dominican rap remix featuring Dominican artist Punto Rojo. On 16 January 2008 the song reached number one on Billboards Hot Dance Airplay chart.

Track listing
CD single
"Calabria 2007" (Radio Edit) - 3:52
"Calabria 2007" (Club Mix) - 6:31
"Calabria 2007" (Instrumental Mix) - 6:31

Charts

Weekly charts

Year-end charts

Note: Months after the release of "Calabria 2007", its vocalist, Natasja Saad died in a car accident.

"Calabria (Firebeatz Remix)"

In 2014, a remix by Dutch DJ duo Firebeatz was released on 13 October, along with a supporting music video.

Charts

DMNDS and Fallen Roses version
In 2021, DMNDS and Fallen Roses released their version of "Calabria 2007" on Stef van Vugt's Dance Fruits label, a sub-label of his Strange Fruits/Fruits Music record company. Featuring Lujavo & Lunis and Nito-Onna, the song charted in several countries across Europe, and was most successful in Finland.

Track listing
Digital download
"Calabria" - 2:08

Charts

References 

2003 songs
2003 debut singles
2004 singles
2007 singles
2008 singles
2014 singles
English-language Danish songs
Songs written by Rune Reilly Kölsch
House music songs
Reggae fusion songs
Songs released posthumously
Ministry of Sound singles
Ultra Music singles